Kuala Terengganu or Kuala Trengganu may refer to:
Kuala Terengganu, capital of Terengganu, Malaysia
Kuala Terengganu District
Kuala Terengganu (federal constituency), represented in the Dewan Rakyat
Bandar Kuala Trengganu, formerly represented in the Trengganu State Council (1954–59)
Kuala Trengganu Barat, formerly represented in the Trengganu State Council (1954–59)
Kuala Trengganu Selatan, formerly represented in the Trengganu State Council (1954–59)
Kuala Trengganu Tengah, formerly represented in the Trengganu State Council (1954–59); Trengganu State Legislative Council (1959–74)
Kuala Trengganu Utara, formerly represented in the Trengganu State Council (1954–59)